Urmersbach is an Ortsgemeinde – a municipality belonging to a Verbandsgemeinde, a kind of collective municipality – in the Cochem-Zell district in Rhineland-Palatinate, Germany. It belongs to the Verbandsgemeinde of Kaisersesch, whose seat is in the like-named town.

Geography

Location
The municipality lies in the Eifel roughly 2 km north of Kaisersesch and 10 km southwest of Mayen.

Extent of municipal area
In 1787, the area within municipal limits was 361 ha, and in 1789, it was given as 623 Morgen. In 1925, it was quoted as being 433 ha, and today it is slightly bigger at 434 ha.

History
In 1253, Urmersbach had its first documentary mention. Beginning in 1794, it lay under French rule. In 1815 it was assigned to the Kingdom of Prussia at the Congress of Vienna. Since 1946, it has been part of the then newly founded state of Rhineland-Palatinate.

Population development
The oldest population figure comes from 1612 and gives the village's population as 11 incolae, that is to say, families, which suggests roughly 70 persons. In 1784, Urmersbach counted 233 inhabitants, and by 1910, 508. The population changed very little over the Second World War, falling from 471 in 1939 to 465 in 1950. On 31 December 1999, 229 families were living im Urmersbach, comprising 510 persons, of whom 261 were female and 249 male.

Politics

Municipal council
The council is made up of 8 council members, who were elected at the municipal election held on 7 June 2009, and the honorary mayor as chairman. The eight seats on council are shared between two voters’ groups.

Mayor
Urmersbach's mayor isThilo Schmitt, and his deputies are Markus Schröder and Markus Kusterer.

Coat of arms
The German blazon reads: Das Schild in Silber, darauf ein rotes Andreaskreuz, belegt mit zwei goldenen Ähren.

The municipality's arms might in English heraldic language be described thus: Argent a saltire gules charged with two ears of wheat per saltire Or.

The two crossed ears of wheat stand for both agriculture and the miller's craft, both of which underlay the village's livelihood for centuries.

Culture and sightseeing

Buildings
The following are listed buildings or sites in Rhineland-Palatinate’s Directory of Cultural Monuments:
 Saint Andrew’s Catholic Church (branch church; Filialkirche St. Andreas), Auf'm Henchen – Baroque aisleless church, 1792, expansion 1954
 Hauptstraße 30 – basalt wayside cross, marked 1725
 Hauptstraße 32 – basalt fountain, 19th century
 Hauptstraße 51 – grave cross, marked 1824
 Obermühle (“Upper Mill”) – solid building with timber-frame gable, 1906, two smaller barns, millrace

Pfarrkirche St. Andreas
The history of Saint Andrew's Parish Church (Pfarrkirche St. Andreas) in Urmersbach goes back to a reference in a 1574 Weistum (a Weistum – cognate with English wisdom – was a legal pronouncement issued by men learned in law in the Middle Ages and early modern times). The chapel patron, Saint Andrew, was named for the first time in connection with setting the boundaries of the Polcher Holz (woodland). The chapel itself was first mentioned in 1613. Documents from 1784 describe the chapel as having fallen into disrepair (“zerfallen”). The chapel was rebuilt in 1787. Work ended in 1791. In 1954, the chapel was expanded and renovated to plans by the architect Böhr from Mayen. It retains its resulting form today from that time.

Regular events

Kirmes
The village fair (Dorfkirmes) is held each year in September. The event, organized by the four clubs of the fair association (Kirmesgesellschaft), features, by longstanding tradition, fireworks in the middle of the village on streets closed specially for this purpose.

Junggesellenfest
Also held each year in September is the traditional Bachelors’ Festival (Junggesellenfest), which is well known far beyond the local area.

Economy and infrastructure

Transport
On 15 May 1895, Urmersbach was linked to the Eifelquerbahn (Cross Eifel Railway between Andernach and Gerolstein), which still runs through the village today.

References

External links

Municipality’s official webpage 

Cochem-Zell